Last Bench is a 2012 Indian Malayalam drama film, directed by Jiju Asokan and produced by T.B. Raghuanthan. The film stars Mahesh, Jyothi Krishna, Sukanya and Chinchu Mohan in lead roles. The film had musical score by Mohan Sithara and Vishnu Sarath. This film marks the Malayalam debut of Mahesh.

Cast

Mahesh as Rejimon
Siju Wilson as Wilson Joseph
Vijeesh as Ambareesh
Musthafa as Samkutty
Biyon as Rasheed
Jyothi Krishna  as Sneha
Sukanya as Rosili
Manju Satheesh as Deepa
Chinchu Mohan
Lakshmi Priya as Smitha
  Vijayan Karanthoor as George  
Ramadevi as Kamalam
Anoop George
Balachandran Chullikkaduu as Vinyan
Pooja

Release 
Rediff gave the film a rating of one-and-a-half out of five stars and noted that "Last Bench turns out to be a major disappointment". The Times of India gave the film a rating of one out of five stars and noted that "Last Bench suffers from its intolerable pre-occupation with the past and the way characters are burdened with feelings of loss, guilt and longing".

References

External links
 

2012 films
2010s Malayalam-language films